Valerio Sozzi (born 6 December 1968) is an Italian equestrian. He competed at the 1992 Summer Olympics and the 1996 Summer Olympics.

References

External links
 

1968 births
Living people
Italian male equestrians
Olympic equestrians of Italy
Equestrians at the 1992 Summer Olympics
Equestrians at the 1996 Summer Olympics
Sportspeople from the Province of Varese